Rainbow Race is the fourth studio album by Pete Seeger and was released in 1971 on the Columbia Records label. The cover photograph was by David Gahr.

Track listing

References

1971 albums
Pete Seeger albums
Albums produced by Bob Johnston
Columbia Records albums